Leonard Henderson (October 6, 1772 – August 13, 1833) was an American jurist who served as chief justice of the North Carolina Supreme Court from 1829 to 1833, and an associate judge of that court beforehand.

Biography
Henderson was born in Granville County, North Carolina on October 6, 1772. His father, Richard Henderson, was a pioneer, state Superior Court judge and politician.  His brother, Archibald Henderson, was a state legislator and member of the U.S. House of Representatives.  He read law under his father's cousin, Judge John Williams.

Henderson served as a state superior court judge from 1808 until 1816. When the North Carolina General Assembly created the state Supreme Court in 1818, it elected Henderson as one of the first members of the three-judge court.  The judges of the Court elected Henderson their Chief in 1829 after the death of Chief Justice Taylor. Henderson was also a trustee of the University of North Carolina at Chapel Hill.

Judge Henderson died in Williamsboro, in what is today Vance County, North Carolina, on August 13, 1833.

Henderson, North Carolina; Hendersonville, North Carolina; and Henderson County, North Carolina are named for him.

Notes

References
The Heritage of Vance County. Vance County Historical Society. 1984. page 24.
North Carolina Reports, NC Supreme Court, 1919

External links

Article on Richard and Leonard Henderson at Rootsweb
North Carolina Historical Marker

1772 births
1833 deaths
People from Vance County, North Carolina
Chief Justices of the North Carolina Supreme Court
U.S. state supreme court judges admitted to the practice of law by reading law
People from Granville County, North Carolina
19th-century American judges